The ECAC West men's tournament was a Division III conference tournament held from establishment of the ECAC West as an independent league until the dissolution of the conference in 2017.

History
The ECAC West men's tournament began in 1985, a year after the ECAC West split from ECAC 2 and followed the same format it had during the time in its predecessor. In the first 8 years the champion received an automatic bid to the NCAA Tournament. In 1992 an effort was made by some universities to restart the Division II Championship. Because Mercyhurst was one such team all SUNYAC members were forced to leave the conference and membership dropped to 7 schools. This necessitated a change to the conference tournament which was decreased from 8 to 4 participants. During the 90's the league would routinely send members to both the D-II and D-III national tournaments but all efforts at continuing the second-tier tournament ended after 1998.

The 4-member tournament continued unabated until 2007 when a single quarterfinal game was instituted. This arrangement held for six years before a second quarterfinal match was instituted and the 6-team tournament continued until the entire tournament was discontinued in 2017 due to the conference's dissolution.

1985

Note: * denotes overtime period(s)

1986

Note: Canisius was invited to play in the tournament despite not being an ECAC West member

Note: * denotes overtime period(s)

1987

Note: Canisius was invited to play in the tournament despite not being an ECAC West member

Note: * denotes overtime period(s)

1988

Note: * denotes overtime period(s)

1989

Note: * denotes overtime period(s)

1990

Note: * denotes overtime period(s)

1991

Note: * denotes overtime period(s)

1992

Note: * denotes overtime period(s)

1993

Note: * denotes overtime period(s)

1994

Note: * denotes overtime period(s)

1995

Note: * denotes overtime period(s)

1996

Note: * denotes overtime period(s)

1997

Note: Niagara possessed the second best record in the conference but was ineligible for tournament play

Note: * denotes overtime period(s)

1998

Note: * denotes overtime period(s)

1999

Note: * denotes overtime period(s)

2000

Note: * denotes overtime period(s)

2001

Note: * denotes overtime period(s)

2002

Note: * denotes overtime period(s)

2003

Note: * denotes overtime period(s)

2004

Note: * denotes overtime period(s)

2005

Note: * denotes overtime period(s)

2006

Note: * denotes overtime period(s)

2007

Note: * denotes overtime period(s)

2008

Note: * denotes overtime period(s)

2009

Note: * denotes overtime period(s)

2010

Note: * denotes overtime period(s)

2011

Note: * denotes overtime period(s)

2012

Note: * denotes overtime period(s)

2013

Note: * denotes overtime period(s)

2014

Note: * denotes overtime period(s)

2015

Note: * denotes overtime period(s)

2016

Note: * denotes overtime period(s)

2017

Note: * denotes overtime period(s)

Championships

See also
ECAC 2 Tournament

References

Ice hockey
Recurring sporting events established in 1985
Recurring sporting events disestablished in 2017
1985 establishments in the United States